The sixteenth series of British reality television series The Apprentice (UK) premiered on 6 January 2022 in the UK on BBC One. It is the first series to be broadcast since the COVID-19 pandemic, with filming originally planned to begin in spring 2020, however the pandemic forced the BBC to postpone production until the following year. The BBC instead aired six special compilation episodes featuring highlights from previous series which aired from 1 October to 5 November 2020. The series features sixteen candidates and sees Tim Campbell, the winner of the first series replace Claude Littner as Lord Sugar's aide, after Littner suffered an injury whilst cycling. The candidates for the sixteenth series were revealed on 4 January 2022, two days before the show's premiere.

Due to a double firing after the tenth task, for the time first since the eighth series the interviews stage featured four candidates, as opposed to the usual final five. It's also the only series not to feature the "discount buying task", which has been a staple since the first series.  As well, for the first time the final four interview candidates were all women.  The series ended on 24 March 2022 with Harpreet Kaur winning the £250,000 investment. Kathryn Louise Burn finished as the runner-up.

Series overview
This series features 16 candidates to become Lord Sugar's business partner. Due to Claude Littner suffering an injury whilst cycling, Sugar's search for his replacement led to him deciding to offer the role to Tim Campbell, the winner of the first series. For the tasks would be from Portsmouth to KidZania London. Both teams adopted names in the third task as each having mixed genders, with the names Infinity and Diverse. Due to both teams losing in the tenth task since the eleventh series, there was a double firing in the tenth task, making it the first time the interviews stage features four candidates as opposed to the final five since the eighth series. It also features Mike Soutar, a regular of the interviews stage, filling in for Campbell for the tenth task, due to Campbell self-isolating after coming in contact with someone who tested positive for Covid-19. Of those who took part, Harpreet Kaur would become the eventual winner, going on to use her prize to set up a dessert parlour she would rename Oh So Yum.

Candidates

Performance chart

Key:
 The candidate won this series of The Apprentice.
 The candidate was the runner-up.
 The candidate won as project manager on his/her team, for this task.
 The candidate lost as project manager on his/her team, for this task.
 The candidate was on the winning team for this task / they passed the Interviews stage.
 The candidate was on the losing team for this task.
 The candidate was brought to the final boardroom for this task.
 The candidate was fired in this task.
 The candidate lost as project manager for this task and was fired.
 The candidate left the competition on this task.

Episodes

Controversies 
During the show's television run, Lord Sugar sent two tweets criticizing Amy Anzel's performances in various tasks. He described her sales technique as "slow" and stated "I think if I came up with a task of the life  and time of Amy Anzel she would still be sub team leader." Anzel later complained to Naked TV, the show's production company, about the tweets. She did not appear on the "You're Hired" episode of the accompanying post-episode chat series, which she blamed on her complaints. The production company stated invitations to the episode were made at their discretion. (Harry Mahmood and Navid Sole were also absent, allegedly due to a fight with Aaron Willis, despite them both appearing in the final task).

References

External links
Official site BBC

The Apprentice (British TV series) seasons
2022 British television seasons
Television productions postponed due to the COVID-19 pandemic